Kathleen "Kay" Walsh (15 November 1911 – 16 April 2005) was an English actress, dancer, and screenwriter. Her film career prospered after she met her future husband film director David Lean, with whom she worked on prestige productions such as In Which We Serve and Oliver Twist.

Early life and career
Walsh was born on 15 November 1911 in Chelsea, London. She was raised in Pimlico by her grandmother. She began her career as a dancer in West End music halls, and at the age of 17 she began going out with Pownoll Pellew (later 9th Viscount Exmouth), and they shared an interest in sports cars. She made her film debut in How's Chances? (1934) in a small part, and had a larger role in Get Your Man, another 1934 film. She continued to act in "quota quickies" films for several years. Walsh first met David Lean, then a film editor, in 1936, during the filming of Secret of Stamboul. They began a relationship, and Walsh broke her engagement to Pellew. Walsh and Lean married on 23 November 1940. She moved on to prestige films with appearances in In Which We Serve (1942) and This Happy Breed (1944), both directed by Lean and written by Noël Coward. Walsh campaigned for Lean to receive co-director credit on In Which We Serve.

Walsh contributed dialogue to the 1938 film of Pygmalion, and devised the scenario for the closing sequence of Lean's film adaptation of Great Expectations (1946), for which she received a writing credit on the latter film. She devised the opening sequence of Lean's adaptation of Oliver Twist (1948) and played Nancy. Walsh and Lean divorced in 1949 on grounds of infidelity based on Lean's relationship with actress Ann Todd. Walsh continued to work as a character actress in films through the 1950s, including films with Alfred Hitchcock and Ronald Neame. Her own favourite film role was that of the barmaid Miss D. Coker in Neame's 1958 film of The Horse's Mouth, with Alec Guinness.

Between films, she appeared regularly in plays and farces at the Strand and Aldwych theatres, directed by Basil Dean. She starred with Peter Coke in the 1938 thriller Death on the Table and Ralph Lynn at Aldwych in the 1940 comedy Nap Hand. She was a semi-regular on the 1979 Anglo-Polish TV series Sherlock Holmes and Dr. Watson, and remained active in films until her retirement in 1981. Her last role was in Night Crossing.

Second marriage, later life, and death
Her second marriage was to the Canadian psychoanalyst Elliott Jaques, and they adopted daughter Gemma in 1956. This marriage also ended in divorce.

She lived in retirement in London. She died on 16 April 2005 at the Chelsea and Westminster Hospital, aged 93, from multiple burns, following an accident.

Filmography

Notes

References

 Kevin Brownlow, David Lean, Faber & Faber, 1997.
 Silverman, Stephen M., David Lean, Harry N. Abrams, 1989.

External links

1911 births
2005 deaths
20th-century English actresses
Actresses from London
English film actresses
English people of Irish descent
English stage actresses
English television actresses
People from Chelsea, London